Can't Get Enough is the 2013 debut release by The Rides, a band consisting of Stephen Stills, Kenny Wayne Shepherd and Barry Goldberg.

Track listing

Personnel 
The Rides
 Stephen Stills – vocals, guitars
 Kenny Wayne Shepherd – vocals, guitars
 Barry Goldberg – keyboards

Additional musicians
 Kevin McCormick – bass
 Chris Layton – drums
 Luis Conte – percussion
 Alethea Mills – backing vocals 
 Chavonne Stewart – backing vocals

Production 
 Jerry Harrison – producer 
 John Hiler – engineer 
 Wil Anspach – assistant engineer 
 Brendan Dekora – assistant engineer 
 Ben O'Neil – assistant engineer 
 Eric "ET" Thorngren – mixing 
 Bernie Grundman – mastering at Bernie Grundman Mastering (Hollywood, California)
 Stu Fine – A&R 
 Gary Burden – art direction, design 
 Jenice Heo – art direction
 Eleanor Stills – photography 
 Kelly Muchoney Johnson – business management
 Elliot Roberts, Kristin Forbes and Ken Shepherd – personal management

References

2013 debut albums
Blues rock albums by American artists